Disaster convergence is the phenomenon of individuals or groups moving towards a disaster-stricken area. Convergers have many reasons for heading towards a disaster area. Kendra and Wachtendorf (2002) identified seven distinct categories of convergers. These categories are mourners, the anxious, returners, the curious, the helpers, the exploiters, and the supporters.

Sources
Kendra, J. and Wachtendorf, T. (2002) Reconsidering Convergence and Converger - Legitimacy in Response to the World Trade Center Disaster. Research in Social Problems and Public Policy 11: 197–224.

Convergence